Table tennis at the 1968 Summer Paralympics consisted of fifteen events, eight for men and seven for women.

Medal table

Medal summary

Men's events

Women's events

References 

 

1968 Summer Paralympics events
1968
Paralympics